"Dragon's Domain" is the eighth episode of the first series of Space: 1999.  The screenplay was written by Christopher Penfold; the director was Charles Crichton.  The final shooting script was dated 21 January 1975, with blue-page amendments dated 29 January 1975 and yellow-page amendments dated 30 January 1975.  Live-action filming took place Monday 27 January 1975 through Monday 10 February 1975.

Story 
It is 877 days after leaving Earth orbit, and the Moon is passing through a stretch of peaceful empty space between galaxies.  Doctor Helena Russell is alone in her quarters, typing a report on a World Space Commission Medical Department form regarding the status of astronaut Captain Tony Cellini.  Hours earlier, during the simulated 'night-time' on Moonbase Alpha, Cellini awakens in a cold sweat.  Sensing danger, he seizes an antique tomahawk from a decorative weapons display.  After making several lunges at an imagined enemy (which he perceives as a swirling display of light accompanied by an electronic screeching sound), Cellini ends up hacking the tomahawk deep into the communications post in his quarters.

Medical Computer alerts Helena of Cellini's elevated pulse and metabolic rate.  When she contacts him, he assures her that it was just a bad dream.  Though not entirely convinced, she bids him a good night.  Still in his pyjamas, Cellini leaves his quarters and makes for the Embarkation Area.  His entry into this restricted area while off-duty attracts attention:  John Koenig, overseeing the night shift in Main Mission, receives the report from Computer.  Suspicious, the Commander orders Cellini's commlock cancelled.

Cellini's progress is halted by his now non-operational commlock.  He encounters Alan Carter and renders him unconscious, appropriating his commlock.  He uses it to gain access to the stand-by Eagle.  By the time Koenig arrives at the launch pad, Cellini is firing up the ship's engines.  The Commander overrides the safety protocols and re-connects the boarding tube; the lift-off is automatically aborted by this action.  Koenig boards the Eagle and each man grabs a stun-gun from the weapons rack.  During the face-off, Cellini asks Koenig to let him go but Koenig stuns him.

As Helena cares for the unconscious Cellini, she discusses his case with Koenig.  She believes that Cellini is mentally unstable and a threat to the safety of himself and others.  Koenig will not accept her diagnosis—he is a long-time friend of Cellini, whom he knows to be an accomplished astronaut, athlete and poet.  Five years before, Cellini had a traumatic experience during his mission to the planet Ultra.  He never recovered.  The two quarrel when she reveals that, at the time, she saw Cellini as a patient; her report to the Space Commission may have helped further damage his reputation.

Flashback: 9 March 1996.  At Alpha's Technical Section, astronauts Koenig, Cellini and Professor Victor Bergman were working out the final details of the Ultra Probe, a high-profile deep-space mission to explore the then-newly discovered planet Ultra.  This tenth planet, discovered by Bergman in 1994, showed every indication of being habitable.  Both equally qualified, Cellini and Koenig could not decide which of them would command the mission.  The two friends left the choice up to a coin-toss.  Cellini won.

The Ultra Probe departed from the Interplanetary Space Station on its seven-month journey on 6 June 1996, with Cellini and three other crewmembers; Darwin King, Juliet Mackie and Monique Bouchere. On arriving at Ultra—and out of direct communication with Moonbase Alpha—the ship encountered a collection of drifting alien spacecraft, all seemingly lifeless. The crew decided to dock with one of the silent vessels. As the airlock opened, there was an unexpected phenomenon—swirling light, raging wind, screeching noise—and King shouted to Cellini to close the airlock.  Emitting a deafening electronic scream, a huge, tentacled creature with one blazing eye and a fiery maw materialised in the probe ship.  The crew's efforts to defend themselves failed and, one by one, they were hypnotised by the creature, devoured alive, and their charred remains regurgitated.

Cellini was trapped in the command module by a system failure.  After a hasty repair job, he released the jammed door in time to witness the death of the last of his shipmates, Monique Bouchere.  He fired on the creature, but the laser beams had no effect.  Cellini retreated to the command module, pursued by the monster.  Fending off the creature's tentacles with a fire axe, he sealed the doors.  He then blasted the command module free from the body of the probe-ship to use as an escape craft. Cellini managed to slingshot around Ultra on a return vector for home.

After a six-month journey, he reached Earth barely alive, sustained by survival rations and sheer courage.  His accomplishment was soon overshadowed by the worldwide disbelief of his horrific tale of the alien monster.  While recuperating in a hospital, Cellini was visited by Helena Russell, on behalf of the Space Commission Medical Department, to evaluate his competency.  When the conversation turned to the Ultra Probe incident, he became physically and verbally agitated, and Helena was forced to order sedation as the hysterical Cellini pleaded with her to believe him.

World Space Commission executive Commissioner Dixon summoned Cellini, Koenig and Bergman to his office.  He stated bluntly that there was no evidence on the flight recorder of any 'monster'.  He judged that Cellini bungled the decompression procedure, killed his crew and refused to accept the blame.  When questioned, Bergman and Koenig tried not to implicate their friend, but were forced to admit there were no facts to support his tale (or refute it, Koenig noted).  Dixon grounded Koenig and Bergman as punishment for their 'misguided' support of Cellini.  The scapegoat himself was then sent for extended psychiatric assessment.

Time passed, and Dixon's tenure as commissioner ended.  Bergman was again welcome on Alpha as a visiting scientist, and Helena was posted there as head of the Medical Section.  In September 1999, Koenig was appointed base commander to resolve the Meta Probe crisis, and he transferred his friend Cellini back to Alpha's Reconnaissance Section.  After the Moon's breakaway, all memory of the Ultra Probe incident was obliterated by their struggle to survive in a hostile universe—until Cellini's irrational behaviour on this night revived the controversy...

Back in the present, Koenig and Helena reconcile.  As they discuss Cellini, which almost results in another argument, the man regains consciousness.  He tells Koenig and Helena that his attempt to depart Alpha was in response to an unconscious feeling that the Ultra Probe monster was near and he needed to go out and face it.  Koenig is unsure what to believe.

A summons from Main Mission calls Koenig away from Medical Centre. Waiting for him on the big screen is an image of a jumbled assortment of drifting alien spacecraft.  Despite five years' time and a distance of uncountable light-years, Koenig uncannily knows it is the spaceship graveyard Cellini had described encountering behind Ultra.  Further investigation reveals the main module of the Ultra Probe still docked with one of the derelicts.  Koenig agrees to investigate, and Cellini feels redeemed.

Boarding Eagle One, Cellini tells Koenig he is going up front to apologise to Carter for his earlier assault.  However, he again knocks Carter unconscious and hijacks the Eagle, leaving the passenger module (containing Koenig and company) behind on the launch pad.  He radios Koenig, informing him that the beast is his enemy and he must face it—alone. Koenig orders Eagles Three and Four to pursue Cellini and Eagle Two to pick up his abandoned passenger module.  He still supports Cellini—even though his friend's actions could be interpreted as a desperate attempt to destroy evidence.  Cellini docks Eagle One's command module where the probe-ship's pilot module had been affixed.  Taking a knife, a fire axe and rope, he enters the eerie darkness of main module and secures his lifeline to a support girder.  His presence causes the monster to rematerialise, and it grabs Cellini in its tentacles.  Cellini lands several blows with the axe, the monster gets a stranglehold around his neck.

Koenig's Eagle Two docks with the probe-ship; he and the Security team enter the main module to witness the epic battle.  Cellini's lifeline is yanked free by the monster and the astronaut is devoured.  Koenig reckons the monster's weakness could be its massive, exposed 'eye', and retrieves Cellini's axe.  Evading the flailing tentacles, Koenig dives in and, hacking away at the eye, slays the monster.

Back on Alpha, after the Moon has drifted out of range of the spaceship graveyard, Helena sits at her typewriter. Ruminating that when the Alphans finally settle on their new home, they will need a whole new mythology.  She suggests to Koenig the tale of Tony Cellini and the Monster, akin to the story of George and the Dragon.  She then closes the case, giving the deceased Cellini final vindication.

Cast

Starring
 Martin Landau — Commander John Koenig
 Barbara Bain — Doctor Helena Russell

Also Starring
 Barry Morse — Professor Victor Bergman

Guest Artists
 Gianni Garko — Captain Tony Cellini
 Douglas Wilmer — Commissioner Dixon
 Barbara Kellerman — Doctor Monique Bouchere
 Michael Sheard — Doctor Darwin King
 Susan Jameson — Professor Juliet Mackie

Featuring
 Prentis Hancock — Controller Paul Morrow
 Clifton Jones — David Kano
 Zienia Merton — Sandra Benes
 Anton Phillips — Doctor Bob Mathias
 Nick Tate — Captain Alan Carter

Uncredited Artists
 Suzanne Roquette — Tanya
 James Fagan — Astronaut Pete Johnson
 Bob Sherman — 'Space News' Newsreader
 Gwen Taylor — Earth Hospital Nurse
 Sarah Bullen — Kate

Music

In addition to the regular Barry Gray score (drawn primarily from "Matter of Life and Death" and "Another Time, Another Place"), Remo Giazotto's composition ‘Adagio in G Minor for Strings and Organ in G Minor’ is played over the flight sequences of the Ultra Probe and the 'space horror music' composed by Vic Elms and Alan Willis for "Ring Around the Moon" is used during the encounters with the monster.

Production notes

 The story, a take on Saint George and the Dragon, was originally conceived as a vehicle for Nick Tate with Alan Carter having commanded the Ultra Probe and vindicating himself in this story by slaying the beast.  Reports indicate that Martin Landau (always cautious of his male castmates—especially Tate—receiving any significant exposure) influenced the production staff to rewrite the part as a one-off guest role. Script editor Johnny Byrne has suggested the rewriting was performed by Landau and executive producer Gerry Anderson; Byrne himself did not do it, and story consultant Christopher Penfold had already resigned from the show.
 In the final shooting script dated 21 January 1975, the Tony Cellini character is named 'Jim Calder' and Doctor Monique Bouchere is 'Olga Vishenskaya'.  This draft contains no reference to Koenig, Bergman and Dixon mentioning evidence about the spaceship graveyard or the Ultra Probe's docking with the alien ship apart from the scanner contacts and Cellini's testimony.  This dialogue must have been part of the last-minute script amendments: in the final cut, it seems a little odd that Dixon says they have only a series of unidentifiable bleeps on the scanner, but then Koenig states that the black box recorded a tight docking seal and a breathable atmosphere inside the alien spaceship.
 Fulfilling their agreement with RAI, the Italian production company co-funding the first series, Italian actor Gianni Garko would be cast in the role of the tortured astronaut; Jim Calder would be re-christened Tony Cellini.  Garko, though a talented actor, was not a fluent speaker of the English language and, in an ironic twist, asked Nick Tate to help teach him his lines in English.
 Many of the spacecraft miniatures seen in the graveyard sequences had been used before in the series: the Sidon ship from "Voyager's Return", the Atherian ship from "Collision Course", the battleship used in "Alpha Child" and "War Games" and the front piece used to transform the battleship into the Deltan gunship in "The Last Enemy".  Reports indicated that the visual effects crew shot a sequence including Star Trek's USS Enterprise and Doctor Who's TARDIS, but the footage was never used.
 The blue quilted nylon jacket worn by Bergman would be used in the second series as Alan Carter's excursion jacket.  The orange versions of the jacket seen on Koenig and Cellini would be worn next episode by Security personnel and later, in series two, by Maya and a variety of guest artists.  The computer banks seen in the main module of the Ultra Probe ship originated in SHADO Control from the Andersons' previous science-fiction series UFO.  Commissioner Dixon's office on Earth was a redress of M's office from the James Bond film series.  The signature red-leather padded door can be seen at the top of the scene.

Adaptations

Novelisation
The episode was adapted in the sixth Year One Space: 1999 novel Astral Quest by John Rankine, published in 1975.  In the novel, the characters Tony Cellini and Monique Bouchere retain their original names Jim Calder and Olga Vishenskaya.

Comics
In the Italian AMZ comic counterpart of the episode (titled "Nel regno del mostro", literally translated "Into the Monster's kingdom"), the moon arrives in an unidentified system of the Ultra galaxy and Koenig send the Ultra Probe to explore the system.

References

External links
Space: 1999 - "Dragon's Domain" - The Catacombs episode guide
Space: 1999 - "Dragon's Domain" - Moonbase Alpha's Space: 1999 page

1975 British television episodes
Space: 1999 episodes